Harold M. Mulvey (December 5, 1914 – February 27, 2000) was the 18th Attorney General of Connecticut, serving from 1963 to 1968.

Early life and career
Mulvey was born on December 5, 1914 in New Haven, Connecticut, and had four siblings. He attended local public schools in New Haven, and then went off to college, receiving a Bachelor of Arts from Fordham University in 1938, and receiving his law degree from there in 1941.

After serving in World War II in the Coast Guard for four years, he commenced private law practice for a brief period in New York, opened a law office in New Haven and then became the Corporation Counsel of New Haven under Mayor Richard C. Lee, serving from 1961 to 1963. He had previously been a member of the Connecticut Marketing Authority from 1955 until 1961.

Political and judicial career
In 1963, Mulvey, a Democrat, was appointed by Connecticut Governor John Dempsey to be the state Attorney General, filling the unexpired term of Albert L. Coles. He served for four years until 1967, when he won election to the office outright. He  resigned a year later to accept an appointment to the Connecticut Superior Court.

During his time as a Superior Court judge, he presided over the emotionally-charged murder trials of several Black Panthers in the 1970s.

References

Connecticut Democrats
Connecticut lawyers
Connecticut state court judges
1914 births
2000 deaths
20th-century American judges
20th-century American lawyers